The Plurals Party (often known by the abbreviated name Plurals, TPP, दप्पा) is an Indian political party founded in the state of Bihar by Pushpam Priya Choudhary, alumna of the London School of Economics and Institute of Development Studies, whose central policies include employment, education, healthcare, rural development, industrialisation, urban centres and capabilities inclusion of people and the regions. Plurals started its political journey by contesting 2020 Bihar Legislative Assembly election against the National Democratic Alliance of Bharatiya Janata Party and Janata Dal (United) and Grand Alliance of Rashtriya Janata Dal, Indian National Congress and several leftist parties.

History

Formation

The party was founded on 8 March 2020 by Pushpam Priya Choudhary, who was projected by the party as Chief Minister candidate for 2020 Bihar Legislative Assembly election and former civil servant Anupam Kumar Suman who was posted as the special secretary of the Bihar Chief Minister Nitish Kumar before his resignation, who later joined as the General Secretary of the party.

Election Campaign

Pushpam Priya Choudhary travelled across the state and raised the issues of closed industries, unproductive agriculture, ruined heritage and unemployment with the party campaign of "Let’s Open Bihar" and "30 Years Lockdown". She pointed out the underdevelopment of the state in the post-globalisation phase after 1990, which is also synchronised with the Lalu Prasad Yadav-Nitish Kumar regime.

Bihar Assembly Elections

The party made its electoral debut in the 2020 Bihar Legislative Assembly election and contested all 243 seats. As the party opposed the politics of caste and religion following its pluralistic ideology, it declared its candidate’s name while mentioning their profession (doctor, engineer, teacher etc) as their caste and their religion as ‘Bihari’. Many of the nominations of its candidates were rejected, which the party opposed vehemently. All party candidates who contested the elections lost, including party president Pushpam Priya Choudhary who contested from Bankipur and Bisfi constituencies. Party members finally contested on 148 seats including those declared independent because of the delay in party registration. Total vote secured by the candidates on these seats was 2,09,417.

Party Candidates Performance 2020

2020 Bihar Legislative Assembly election

References

External links
 Official website

Political parties in India
Political parties established in 2020
2020 establishments in Bihar
State political parties in Bihar
Identity politics in India